Mari Elina Knihtilä (born 6 June 1971) is a Finnish actress.

Career

Knihtilä has worked for several Finnish theatres, such as the Finnish National Theatre and Q-teatteri, while also having appeared in films and on television. She has received two Jussi Awards; one for a supporting role in the 2008 Heikki Kujanpää film Putoavia enkeleitä and another for a leading role in the 2011 Zaida Bergroth film Hyvä poika. Some of her television work include the comic roles in Läpiveto, Vedetään hatusta and the first season of Putous.

Personal life

Knihtilä is cohabiting with an actor Tommi Korpela. Together they have a son.

Selected filmography 

Hyvän tekijät (1997)
Hengittämättä & nauramatta (2002)
Lapsia ja aikuisia (2004)
V2 – jäätynyt enkeli (2006)
Matti (2006)
Lieksa! (2007)
Putoavia enkeleitä (2008)
8 päivää ensi-iltaan (2008)
Skavabölen pojat (2009)
Haarautuvan rakkauden talo (2009)
Varasto (2011)
Risto (2011)
Hyvä poika (2011)
Tie pohjoiseen (2012)
Kohta 18 (2012)
Kätilö (2015)
Maria's Paradise (2019)
 Family Time (2023)

On television

Ihana mies (1999)
Kylmäverisesti sinun (2000)
Tummien vesien tulkit (2002)
Ranuan kummit (2003)
Tahdon asia (2005)
Mogadishu Avenue (2006)
Läpiveto (2006–2008)
Suojelijat (2008)
Hymy pyllyyn (2008–2009)
Ihmebantu (2009)
Putous (2010)
Virta (2011)
Vedetään hatusta (2011)
YleLeaks (2011)

References

External links 
 

1971 births
Finnish actresses
Living people